Gelderswoude is a village in the Dutch province of South Holland. It is a part of the municipality of Zoeterwoude, and lies about 5 km northeast of Zoetermeer.

The statistical area "Gelderswoude", which also can include the surrounding countryside, has a population of around 90.

References

Populated places in South Holland
Zoeterwoude